An endangered language is a language that it is at risk of falling out of use, generally because it has few surviving speakers. If it loses all of its native speakers, it becomes an extinct language. UNESCO defines four levels of language endangerment between "safe" (not endangered) and "extinct":
 Vulnerable
 Definitely endangered
 Severely endangered
 Critically endangered

South America is a continent of the Americas, situated entirely in the Western Hemisphere and mostly in the Southern Hemisphere, with a relatively small portion in the Northern Hemisphere. It is bordered on the west by the Pacific Ocean and on the north and east by the Atlantic Ocean; North America and the Caribbean Sea lie to the northwest.

Argentina

Bolivia

Brazil

Chile

Colombia

Ecuador

French Guiana

Guyana

Paraguay

Peru

Suriname

Venezuela

References

South America
Endangered languages